The Clementine Hall, called the Sala Clementina (The Clementine Salon) is a hall of the Apostolic Palace near St. Peter's Basilica in Vatican City. It was established in the 16th century by Pope Clement VIII in honor of Pope Clement I, the third successor of St. Peter. The Clementine Hall is covered in Renaissance frescoes and valuable works of art.  It is used by the pope as a reception room and in some cases, site of various ceremonies and rituals.  The Clementine Hall is the chamber in which the body of the pope lies for private visitation by officials of the Vatican upon death, like that most recently of the funeral of Pope John Paul II. The pope's body is then traditionally moved from the Clementine Hall and ceremonially carried across St. Peter's Square to St. Peter's Basilica or the Basilica of San Giovanni in Laterano.

Frescos
Over the doors appears the fresco "The Martyrdom of St. Clement" by the Dutch painter Paul Bril.  On the opposite wall appear the frescos "The Baptism of St. Clement" by Italian painters Cherubino Alberti and Baldassare Croce, and an "Allegory of Art and Science" by Giovanni and Cherubino Alberti.  The frieze on the side walls depict allegories of the cardinal virtues by Alberti and Croce and the theological virtues, on the opposite wall, by the same artists. On the ceiling is “The Apotheosis of St. Clement" by Giovanni Alberti.

References
Pietrangelli, Carlo, Paintings in the Vatican, 

Apostolic Palace
Individual rooms